The government of Ángel Garrido was formed on 22 May 2018, following the latter's election as President of the Community of Madrid by the Assembly of Madrid on 18 May and his swearing-in on 21 May, as a result of the resignation of the former president, Cristina Cifuentes, over a string of scandals involving the fraudulent obtention of a master's degree, the subsequent document forgery to cover it up and the leaking of a 2011 shoplifting video in which she was involved.

The cabinet comprised members of the PP and a number of independents. It was automatically dismissed on 13 April 2019 as a consequence of Garrido's resignation as president in order to run in his party's lists to the 2019 European Parliament election, but remained in acting capacity until the next government was sworn in. Two weeks later, and just four days ahead of the April 2019 Spanish general election, Garrido defected to the Citizens (Cs) party.

Investiture

Cabinet changes
The only change during the tenure of Garrido's government was the resignation of Ángel Garrido himself on 11 April 2019 in order to be able to be included within the People's Party (PP)'s lists to the 2019 European Parliament election as a result of the law barring incumbent members of regional members from running. A mere two weeks later on 24 April, and just a couple of days ahead of the April 2019 Spanish general election, Garrido announced his defection to Citizens (Cs).

As a result of the president's resignation, the whole cabinet was forced to step down on 13 April and remain in acting capacity until a new government was sworn in, with vice president and minister of the presidency Pedro Rollán serving as acting president in the meantime.

Council of Government
The Council of Government was structured into the office for the president, the vice president and nine ministries.

Notes

References

2018 establishments in the Community of Madrid
2019 disestablishments in the Community of Madrid
Cabinets established in 2018
Cabinets disestablished in 2019
Cabinets of the Community of Madrid